Ripak-e Saleh (also Romanized as Rīpak-e Şāleḩ; also known as Rīpak-e Şāleḩ Bāzār) is a village in Negur Rural District, Dashtiari District, Chabahar County, Sistan and Baluchestan Province, Iran. At the 2006 census, its population was 680, in 140 families.

References 

Populated places in Chabahar County